Barbara Krause (later Wanja, born 7 July 1959 in East Berlin) is a former freestyle swimmer from East Germany. She was a three-time Olympic gold medalist and eight-time world record holder. At the 1980 Summer Olympics in Moscow, Krause won gold medals in the 100 m and 200 m freestyle and in the 4×100 m freestyle relay.

Her husband, Lutz Wanja, is also a retired German Olympic swimmer.

East German doping

Krause, like many of the East German athletes of the time, was doped by her coaches under instruction from the Stasi. At the time of the 1976 Summer Olympics in Montreal Krause was forced off the East German swimming team because "team doctors had miscalculated her dose of drugs and worried she might test positive at the Games".

Both of her children were born with deformed feet, which was later attributed to her use of steroids.

See also
 List of members of the International Swimming Hall of Fame

References

External links

 Schwimmen – Europameisterschaften (Damen – Teil 1). sport-komplett.de 
 Schwimmen – Europameisterschaften (Damen – Teil 2). sport-komplett.de 
 

1959 births
Living people
People from East Berlin
Swimmers from Berlin
Olympic swimmers of East Germany
East German female freestyle swimmers
Swimmers at the 1980 Summer Olympics
Olympic gold medalists for East Germany
World record setters in swimming
Medalists at the 1980 Summer Olympics
World Aquatics Championships medalists in swimming
European Aquatics Championships medalists in swimming
German sportspeople in doping cases
Doping cases in swimming
Olympic gold medalists in swimming
Recipients of the Patriotic Order of Merit in silver